Lewisville Township is one of fifteen townships in Forsyth County, North Carolina, United States. The township had a population of 17,707 according to the 2010 census.

Geographically, Lewisville Township occupies  in southwestern Forsyth County.  Lewisville Township contains the town of Lewisville and parts of the village of Clemmons.  The township fronts the Yadkin River on its western boundary.

References

Townships in Forsyth County, North Carolina
Townships in North Carolina